The 1949–50 season was the 35th in the history of the Isthmian League, an English football competition.

Leytonstone were champions, winning their sixth Isthmian League title. At the end of the season Tufnell Park merged with Edmonton Borough to form Tufnell Park Edmonton.

League table

References

Isthmian League seasons
I